Thylacine may refer to:

Thylacine, largest known carnivorous marsupial of modern times commonly known as the Tasmanian tiger
Thylacine (band), Australian alternative band
Thylacine Darner, or scientifically Acanthaeschna victoria, species of dragonfly in family Aeshnidae and endemic to Australia
 Thylacine (album)